The Peki’in Synagogue, is a synagogue located in the centre of Peki'in, Northern Israel. The current building was erected in 1873, on the site of older ones. Local tradition holds that it has two stones taken from the walls of the Jewish Temple in Jerusalem built into its walls.

The synagogue, not usually active as of 2005, is kept by Margalit Zinati (born 1931). Zinati is a member of a Jewish family who have lived for centuries in Peki'in, reportedly since the time of the Second Temple. Margalit Zinati, the last Jewish woman in Peki'in, was honoured for her work on the 70th Independence Day in 2018, and her family home is run as a heritage site by the Education Department of the World Zionist Organization (WZO).

Tradition
According to local tradition, the synagogue was built on the site of the beth midrash (religious school) where Rabbi Joshua ben Hananiah taught before the Bar Kokhba revolt, and Rabbi Shimon bar Yochai after it. There is dissent among scholars on whether the cave and town known from the life story of Shimon bar Yochai can be identified with modern Peki'in.

Research

The current structure dates from 1873; the former one was destroyed by an earthquake 30 years earlier. Funding for the construction, attested to on a plaque commemorating the donation, was given by a Jew named Rafael Halevy from Beirut.

Carved stones from ancient synagogue
In 1926 and 1930 two old stone tablets were uncovered, reused in the walls of the modern synagogue. One depicts a menorah flanked by a lulav, etrog, shofar, and incense shovel. The second one, of higher craftsmanship, depicts a Torah shrine. A third stone contains a fragmentary relief of a grapevine, found in secondary use in a modern village house. All three have been dated between the late 2nd century CE and the early 3rd. It has been suggested that the second stone may have come from another, now disappeared Galilean synagogue from Khirbet Tiriya or Tiriha. Further decorated stones believed to originate from an ancient synagogue were reused in modern buildings in Peki'in.

Ancient inscriptions
In February 2017, the Council for Conservation of Heritage Sites in Israel uncovered an 1,800-year-old limestone capital. Engraved on it are two Hebrew inscriptions dating to the Roman period. The column was found upside down in the building's courtyard. According to the IAA's regional inspector, "A preliminary analysis of the engravings suggests that these are dedicatory inscriptions honoring donors to the synagogue." Uriel Rosenboym, director of Beit Zinati (the WZO Jewish heritage site), exclaimed that "No one can argue with the written artifact. There was an ancient synagogue here and the synagogue was built in its current form in recent centuries."

Public awareness

In 1922 Yitzhak Ben-Zvi visited the Jewish community of Peki’in and documented it in his book Shaar Yashuv.

In 1955 the Israeli Ministry of Religious Affairs renovated the building at the request of by then president Yitzhak Ben-Zvi.

The Second Series of the Israeli new sheqel (NIS), put in circulation in 1999, features on the 100 NIS banknote a portrait of Ben-Zvi (front), and the Peki'in synagogue along with a view of the village (back).

References

Further reading

I. Ben-Zevi. "Discoveries at Pekiin." Palestine Exploration Fund Quarterly Statement, 62(4), pp. 210–214. 
E. L. Sukenik. "Designs of the Torah Shrine in Ancient Synagogues in Palestine." Palestine Exploration Fund Quarterly Statement, 63(3), pp. 22–25. 

Ancient synagogues in the Land of Israel
Buildings and structures in Northern District (Israel)
1873 establishments in Ottoman Syria